Göktepe (former Fariske) is a belde (town) in Karaman Province, Turkey.

Geography

Göktepe is a belde (town) in Sarıveliler district which is a part of Karaman Province. Göktepe is quite detached from the main highways. The population was 2071 as of 2009.

History
There are ruins, caves, and tombs which show that the vicinity of the town was inhabited during the time of the Roman Empire. During the Ottoman Empire, the town was mentioned in the 17th century Seyahatname (travel book) of Evliya Çelebi. In 1956, Göktepe was declared a township.

Economy
Göktepe is a typical agricultural town. Main crops are apples, grapes, cherries and walnuts.

Future

According to Sustainable development report prepared by the Ministry of Environment and Forestry (Turkey) the projected population of Göktepe in 2025 is 10000. The present master plan  of the town is found to be insufficient for the future expansion. A new plan is proposed for the future.

References

Populated places in Karaman Province
Towns in Turkey
Sarıveliler District